The Teshkan Bridge in Badashkhan is a bridge across the Kokcha River.
Highway 302, which crosses the bridge, is the only road connection between Badashkhan and the rest of Afghanistan.

In 1999 the bridge was a strategic resource fought over by two competing militia leaders.

In 2007 ISAF forces and Provincial Reconstruction Team Feyzabad reconstructed a bridge built by the Soviet Union.
The new bridge took two months to build.
A steel frame and a new surface were built on top of the existing bridge, using the existing bridge pier.
The Governor of Badashkhan presided over the ribbon-cutting on October 16, 2007, when the bridge was recommissioned.

References

Road bridges in Afghanistan
Bridges completed in 2007